Jared Landers (born May 1, 1982) is an American professional dirt and stock car racing driver. He currently competes in the Lucas Oil Late Model Dirt Series, driving the No. 777 car for Double L Motorsports.

Racing career
Landers started racing when his father, a former racer, opened a car sales business. The business sponsored sprint car racer Tim Crawley, who built Landers a dirt go-kart. Landers stopped driving when he became an assistant of Crawley and Terrell Chastain, whom Landers' father's business also sponsored. When he turned 17, Landers returned to racing, driving a modified at Batesville Motor Speedway. open-wheel modifieds, Landers has over 100 wins in the discipline.

Landers later moved from Batesville, Arkansas to Welcome, North Carolina. In North Carolina, he became friends with NASCAR driver Clint Bowyer, who invited him to drive for his late model team. Landers also connected with NASCAR drivers Austin and Ty Dillon, building the brothers a dirt modified.

In 2011, Landers started competing in the Lucas Oil Late Model Dirt Series, winning Rookie of the Year.

In 2013, Landers made his NASCAR debut in the Mudsummer Classic at Eldora Speedway, NASCAR's first dirt track race since 1970. While racing for Bowyer, Landers met former NASCAR driver Mark Martin, who assisted him in adjusting to a stock car for the Mudsummer Classic. Landers won his heat race after holding off Matt Crafton for the win; after starting second in the feature, he finished 12th. Landers later attempted the 2014 Mudsummer Classic but withdrew from the event.

Landers departed Clint Bowyer Racing after the 2014 season and moved back to Arkansas. However, he and Martin remained close and the two co-owned a team with Mark Martin Automotive sponsoring the cars. In 2015, the team hired Scott Bloomquist, who recorded over 550 feature victories, as Landers' teammate.

In July 2016, Landers was competing at Tri-City Speedway when his car flipped; the wreck tore his common carotid artery in his neck. He continued to race until it was discovered in mid-August.

Motorsports career results

NASCAR
(key) (Bold – Pole position awarded by qualifying time. Italics – Pole position earned by points standings or practice time. * – Most laps led.)

Camping World Truck Series

References

External links
 
 

1982 births
Living people
People from Batesville, Arkansas
NASCAR drivers
People from Welcome, North Carolina